Rmelan is a town in the al-Hasakah Governorate in the northeast of Syria. Administratively part of the al-Yaarubiyah nahiyah of al-Malikiyah District, the town is located 900 km northeast of the capital Damascus, 165 km northeast of the governorate capital al-Hasakah, 70 km east of Qamishli, 30 km southwest of the district centre al-Malikiyah and 0.5 km southwest of the sub-district centre Ma'badah. It has an area of 5 km² and a population of 11,500, based on the 2009 official estimate.

The town is famous for being one of the major centres of oil production in Syria. The first oil exploration works in Rmelan started in 1934. However, the town was founded in 1956 along with the discovery of the first oil well in the region, in the area of Karatchok. Later in 1959, the al-Suwaydiyah oil field was also discovered.

The town has a well-developed infrastructure including 22 km of roads, public parks, swimming pools, family clubs, cinema halls and cultural centres. The Town has a large airport that was originally a small agricultural airport, Abu Hajar Airport. It is now being used by the United States for military and civilian use. The town is also home to the Ommal Rmelan (Rmelan Labours) football club. They participate in the third division of the Syrian Football League and play their home games at the Rmelan Municipal Stadium. The population of the town is of mixed Arab, Kurd and Assyrian ethnicities. Many workers from other Syrian regions also reside in Rmelan. The constitutional conferences of the Democratic Federal System of Northern Syria in 2014 and in 2016 have been held in Rmelan.

References

External links

Assyrian communities in Syria
Cities in Syria
Populated places in al-Malikiyah District